The BAFTA Award for Best Film is given annually by the British Academy of Film and Television Arts and presented at the British Academy Film Awards. It has been given since the 1st BAFTA Awards, representing the best films of 1947, but until 1969 it was called the BAFTA Award for Best Film From Any Source. It is possible for films from any country to be nominated, although British films are also recognised in the category BAFTA Award for Best British Film and (since 1983) foreign-language films in BAFTA Award for Best Film Not in the English Language. As such, there have been multiple occasions of a film being nominated in two of these categories.

There has been one tie for the Best Film Award when, in 1962, Ballad of a Soldier tied with The Hustler for Best Film From Any Source. Throughout the history of the category, the award has been given to the director(s), the producer(s) or both.
 Between 1949 and 1959, 1962–1965, 1970–1976, and in 1979; Only the film itself and not producers or directors received the award and nomination.
 Between 1960 and 1961, 1966–1969, and in 1980; Only directors received the award and nomination.
 Between 1988 and 1997; Both producers and directors received the award and nomination.
 Between 1977 and 1978, 1981–1987, and since 1998; Only producers counted as winners and nominees in this category.

In the following lists, the titles and names in bold with a dark grey background are the winners and recipients respectively; those not in bold are the nominees. The years given are those in which the films under consideration were released, not the year of the ceremony, which always takes place the following year.

Winners and nominees

1940s
Best Film from Any Source

1950s

1960s

Best Film

1970s

1980s

1990s

2000s

2010s

2020s

See also 
 Academy Award for Best Picture
 Critics' Choice Movie Award for Best Picture
 Golden Globe Award for Best Motion Picture – Drama
 Golden Globe Award for Best Motion Picture – Musical or Comedy
 Guldbagge Award for Best Film
 Producers Guild of America Award for Best Theatrical Motion Picture
 Screen Actors Guild Award for Outstanding Performance by a Cast in a Motion Picture

Notes

References

External links 
 BAFTA Official Archive (1949–2007)
 BAFTA Awards at Internet Movie Database

British Academy Film Awards

BAFTA winners (films)
Awards for best film
Lists of films by award